The Beat Goes On! is a jazz album by alto saxophonist Sonny Criss recorded in 1968 and released on the Prestige label.

Reception

AllMusic awarded the album 4 stars with its review by Scott Yanow stating, "This is one of a group of Prestige dates by Sonny Criss from the late '60s that featured the altoist elegantly ripping through pop tunes, standing them on their heads and making them into credible vehicles for his dazzling virtuosity."

Track listing
 "The Beat Goes On" (Sonny Bono) – 7:21
 "Georgia Rose" (Jimmy Flynn, Harry Rosenthal, Alex Sullivan) – 3:31
 "Somewhere My Love (Lara's Theme)" (Maurice Jarre, Paul Francis Webster) – 4:58
 "Calidad" (Sonny Criss) – 5:29
 "Yesterdays (Otto Harbach, Jerome Kern) – 5:51
 "Ode to Billie Joe" (Bobbie Gentry) – 6:19

Personnel
Sonny Criss – alto saxophone
Cedar Walton – piano
Bob Cranshaw – bass
Alan Dawson – drums

References

Sonny Criss albums
Prestige Records albums
1968 albums